Paul Salopek (born February 9, 1962 in Barstow, California) is a journalist and writer from the United States.  He is a two-time Pulitzer Prize winner and was raised in central Mexico.
Salopek has reported globally for the Chicago Tribune, Foreign Policy, The Atlantic, National Geographic Magazine and many other publications.
In January 2013, Salopek embarked on the "Out of Eden Walk", originally projected to be a seven-year walk along one of the routes taken by early humans to migrate out of Africa, a transcontinental foot journey that was planned to cover more than 20,000 miles funded by the National Geographic Society, the Knight Foundation and the Abundance Foundation.

Life
Salopek received a degree in environmental biology from the University of California, Santa Barbara in 1984.  Salopek has worked intermittently as a commercial fisherman, shrimp-fishing out of Carnarvon, and most recently with the scallop fleet out of New Bedford, Massachusetts, in 1991. His career in journalism began in 1985 when his motorcycle broke in Roswell, New Mexico and he took a police-reporting job at the local newspaper to earn repair money.

Career
Salopek reported for the Chicago Tribune from 1996 until April 30, 2009, writing about Africa, the Balkans, Central Asia and the wars in Afghanistan and Iraq. He worked for National Geographic from 1992–1995, visiting Chad, Sudan, Senegal, Niger, Mali, and Nigeria.  The October 1995 cover story for National Geographic was Salopek's piece on Africa's mountain gorillas. He reported on U.S.-Mexico border issues for the El Paso Times. In 1990, he was Gannett News Service's bureau chief in Mexico City.

In 1998 he won the Pulitzer Prize for Explanatory Reporting for two articles profiling the Human Genome Diversity Project.  In 2001, he won the Pulitzer Prize for International Reporting for work covering Africa.  Columbia University President George Rupp presented Salopek with the prize, "for his reporting on the political strife and disease epidemics ravaging Africa, witnessed firsthand as he traveled, sometimes by canoe, through rebel-controlled regions of the Congo."

Salopek was a general assignment reporter on the Tribune's Metropolitan staff, reporting on immigration, the environment and urban affairs. He spent several years as the Tribune's bureau chief in Johannesburg. Salopek reported from Sudan for a 2003 National Geographic story, "Shattered Sudan: Drilling for Oil, Hoping for Peace." He wrote "Who Rules the Forest?" from Africa for National Geographic in September 2005, examining the effects of war in Central Africa. While on freelance assignment for National Geographic in Darfur, Sudan, he was ambushed and imprisoned for more than a month in 2006 by pro-government military forces.

In the fall of 2009, Salopek taught an undergraduate seminar on reporting from the developing world at Princeton University as part of Princeton's Journalism Program.

Out of Eden Walk
In January 2013, Salopek embarked on a walk along one of the routes taken by early humans to migrate out of Africa, initially scheduled to take seven years. The transcontinental foot journey will cover more than 21,000 miles,  beginning in Africa, in Ethiopia, across the Middle East and through Asia, via Alaska and down the western edge of the Americas to the southern tip of Chile. The project, entitled Out of Eden Walk, is funded by National Geographic Magazine, the Knight Foundation and the Abundance Foundation. The project is designed as a laboratory of slow journalism that engages with the major stories of our time—from climate change to technological innovation, from mass migration to cultural survival—by walking alongside the populations who inhabit such headlines every day. The object is to immerse readers in the lives of people encountered en route: the nomads, villagers, traders, farmers, and fishermen who rarely make the news. When the trek (originally planned to take seven years) ends, the walk will have generated a global mosaic of stories, faces, sounds, and landscapes highlighting the pathways that connect us to each other—a mostly digital archive of our shared humanity at the start of a new millennium.

 In October 2021, after a 20-month hiatus due to the COVID-19 pandemic, he has made it to China and is continuing the walk (he has not completed the walk within the planned 7 years).

See also
Tim Cope

References

External links

Articles
Shattered Sudan: Drilling for Oil, Hoping for Peace (February 2003 National Geographic)
A Stroll Around the World (November 2013 "New York Times" )

Out of Eden Walk

Dispatches
outofedenwalk.nationalgeographic.com
outofedenwalk.com

Media coverage of the Out of Eden Walk includes
NPR
The Huffington Post
Canadian Broadcasting Company
PBS NewsHour
Chicago Tribune

American newspaper editors
Chicago Tribune people
Elijah Parish Lovejoy Award recipients
Princeton University faculty
1962 births
Living people
Pulitzer Prize for Explanatory Journalism winners
Pulitzer Prize for International Reporting winners
American male journalists
Imprisoned journalists
People from Barstow, California